The Phillips County Courthouse, home of the Phillips Combined Court, located at 221 Interocean Ave. in Holyoke, Colorado was built in 1935 in Moderne style.  It is significant for association with New Deal programs; the Public Works Administration built it, and it is the only surviving PWA project in the county.

It was designed by Denver architect Eugene G. Groves (1882-1967).

It was listed on the National Register of Historic Places in 2007.

References

Courthouses on the National Register of Historic Places in Colorado
Streamline Moderne architecture in the United States
Government buildings completed in 1935
Buildings and structures in Phillips County, Colorado
County courthouses in Colorado
Public Works Administration in Colorado
National Register of Historic Places in Phillips County, Colorado